Harutaeographa bicolorata is a moth of the family Noctuidae. It is found in Nepal (Ganesh Himal).

References
https://www.youtube.com/watch?v=MtN1YnoL46Q

Moths described in 1998
Orthosiini